Halecania athallina is a species of lichen in the family Leprocaulaceae. Found in Alaska, it was described as new to science in 2020 by British lichenologist Alan Fryday. The type specimen was discovered in Hoonah-Angoon Census Area in Glacier Bay National Park. There it was found growing on argillite rock on an alpine heath with rock outcrops.

The thallus of this lichen is completely immersed in its substrate. The specific epithet athallina refers to this characteristic absence of a thallus. The lichen makes dark reddish-brown lecideine apothecia that are typically 0.3–0.4 mm in diameter. The ascospores are hyaline, have a single septum, and measure about 12 by 5 μm. The most morphologically similar lichen is Halecania rhypodiza, but this species has a dark brown thallus and larger spores measuring 12–15 by 4.5–6 μm.

References

Lecanoromycetes
Lichen species
Lichens described in 2020
Lichens of Subarctic America
Fungi without expected TNC conservation status